Buguruslansky District is an administrative and municipal district (raion), one of the thirty-five in Orenburg Oblast, Russia. It is located in the northwest of the oblast. Its administrative center is the town of Buguruslan (which is not administratively a part of the district). Population: 19,680 (2010 Census);

Administrative and municipal status
Within the framework of administrative divisions, Buguruslansky District is one of the thirty-five in the oblast. The town of Buguruslan serves as its administrative center, despite being incorporated separately as an administrative unit with the status equal to that of the districts.

As a municipal division, the district is incorporated as Buguruslansky Municipal District. The Town of Buguruslan is incorporated separately from the district as Buguruslan Urban Okrug.

References

Notes

Sources

Districts of Orenburg Oblast
